Sports Talk was an early Australian television series. Debuting on 9 November 1956, it aired on Melbourne station HSV-7 on a weekly basis until 1958, but was revived for a while in 1959 with a different format.

Hosted by Bill Collins and Harry Gordon, the first version of the series presented sports news and personalities. The 1959 version aired at 11:00PM, was hosted by Lou Richards and focused on football.

See also

List of Australian television series

References

External links

Seven Network original programming
1956 Australian television series debuts
1959 Australian television series endings
Australian sports television series
English-language television shows
Black-and-white Australian television shows